Passage West GAA is a Gaelic Athletic Association club based in the town of Passage West, in County Cork, Republic of Ireland. The club fields teams in both Gaelic football and hurling. It is a member of the Seandún
division of Cork GAA. The club is geographically located in the Carrigdhoun GAA division and was originally a member of it prior to transferring to Seandún following a dispute. The club is currently playing Junior Football and Junior Hurling. The club's ground is located in the Maulbaun area of the town. It also has Ladies Football teams from under 10,11,12,14,16, Minor, under 21, and Junior. It has won Cork County Ladies Football titles in under 12, under 16, as well as the Mid Cork Junior League.

History

Passage West GAA Club was founded in 1885. Three men, Dan Huggins, Mattie Fitzpatrick and Dave O'Neill decided to approach a local farmer known to have a great deal of interest in hurling. The farmer in question was Ned Cadogan of Park Farm. The three men asked Mr Cadogan for the use of land as a playing pitch for hurling.

The following week the three men met again with other enthusiastic gaels and set about setting up a committee with responsibility for affiliating the new club to the Cork County Board of the GAA and, subsequently, for the running the affairs of the club.

The historic first officers of the Passage West club were: Chairman Ned Cadogan, Vice Chairman Thade Lane, Hon Secretary Jack McCarthy, Hon Treasurer Con Spillane. The three founder members, Dan Huggins, Mattie Fitzpatrick and Dave O'Neill, acted as committee members.

The first decision made was that the club colours would be green and white. The first set of jerseys worn by the club was a white jersey with a large green star on the front. The first pitch used was on the land of the chairman Ned Cadogan, adjoining Rathanker, near Monkstown. The pitch was the home to the club for the next thirty years and was also the venue for a historic match in 1896. A game between Redmonds and Blackrock that attracted up to 15 thousand people, the largest crowd ever known to assemble for any event in Passage. People came from Cloyne, Midleton and all parts of the county to witness the contest. Such were the crowd in Passage that the local constabulary authorities in apprehension of a breach of the peace, made an order that all pubs and hotels in the town could not open for liquor between 10 am and 10 pm. Over 100 R.I.C. men were drafted into the town to keep the peace. Redmonds won the contest by 1-3 to 4 points for Blackrock.

In 1887 the committee felt that the team was adequately prepared to enter the first ever Cork Senior Hurling Championship, playing Charleville in the first round. Passage beat Charleville by 1-0 to 0-0 but Charlville filed a protest to Cork County Board on the following grounds: (1) that Passage had men playing who were not residing in the parish, and (2) dubious decisions of the referee during the match, but both objections were rejected.

Passage played Cloyne in round 2, winning 3-7 to 0-0. In the next two rounds Passage defeated Inniscarra and Little Island, thus qualifying to meet Tower Street in the semi-final. Passage played and beat Tower Street 3-4 to 1-6, thus qualifying for the final. Meanwhile, on the other side of the draw, Cork Nationals of Blackrock and St. Finbarr's GAA (the Barr's) reached the semi final; during their game many disputes arose, one been that Cork Nationals claimed a point given to the Barr's was not a point and therefore would not puck out the ball to restart the game. After an investigation into the matter, the County Committee decided that the remaining time would be played by both teams with the winners due to play Passage in the final. The Barr's would not accept the decision and a long protracted series of meetings took place to try to solve the matter.

The end result was that the final was never played due to various reasons. The following year, both Passage and Cork Nationals applied to the County Committee for the medals. However, the trophies were granted to the Blackrock-based club and so, today, the Cork County Board records show that Cork Nationals were the first winners of the Cork Senior Hurling Championship. The County committee denied Passage the opportunity of achieving truly historic status of being the first Senior Hurling Champions of Cork.

Achievements
 Cork Senior Hurling Championship Runners-Up 1887
 Cork Intermediate Hurling Championship Winners (4) 1924, 1925, 1930, 1960  Runner-Up 1975, 1976
 Cork Intermediate Football Championship Winner (1) 1983
 Cork Junior Hurling Championship Winners (2) 1905, 1906  Runner-Up 1945
 Cork Junior Football Championship Winner (1) 1982
 Cork Junior B Football Championship:  Runner-Up 2007 
 Cork Under-21 B Football Championship Runner-Up 2010

South East Division Title Winners
 Minor Hurling Championship Winners (7) 1931, 1932, 1933, 1934, 1946, 1949, 1950
 Minor Football Championship Winners (3) 1933, 1934, 1945.
 Carrigdhoun Junior Hurling Championship Winner (2) 1931, 1945
 Carrigdhoun Junior Football Championship Winner (1) 1944   Runner-Up 1934, 1951

City Titles
 Cork City Junior Hurling Championship Winners (1) 2021; Runner-Up 1990, 1995, 2000, 2002, 2003, 2020
 Cork City Junior Football Championship Winner (6) 1969, 1980, 1982, 1989, 1993, 1994, 2020   Runner-Up 1966, 1967, 1970, 1981, 1992, 2014
 City Junior B Football Championship Winners (3) 1982, 2007, 2012 Runners-up 2014
 City Junior C Football Championship Winners (1) 2007
 City U-21 Football Championship Winners (3) 2003, 2010, 2015 Runners-up 2013, 2014
 City U-21 B Hurling Championship Winners (2) 1982, 1990 2018 runners up 2016
 City Minor Hurling B Championship Winners (4) 1971, 1981, 1999, 2005
 City Minor Hurling B League Winners (4) 1959, 1963, 1972, 1998
 City McSwiney Cup Football Winners (6) 1966, 1967, 1970, 1980, 1981, 1982, 2017
 City McCurtin Cup Hurling Winners (1) 2002 2018
 City Seandun Cup Football Winners (2) 2015, 2017
 City Seandun Junior Hurling A League (2) 2001, 2018

Notable players
 John Horgan
 Justin McCarthy
 Joe Murphy
 Eddie O'Brien
 Cian McCarthy

References

Sources
Passage West GAA Website

Gaelic games clubs in County Cork
Hurling clubs in County Cork
Gaelic football clubs in County Cork